is a railway station in the city of Inuyama, Aichi Prefecture,  Japan, operated by Meitetsu.

Lines

Station layout
The station has two opposed side platforms connected by a level crossing. The station has automated ticket machines, Manaca automated turnstiles and is unattended..

Platforms

Adjacent stations

|-
!colspan=5|Nagoya Railroad

Station history
Gakuden Station was opened on April 29, 1931.

Passenger statistics
In fiscal 2015, the station was used by an average of 3317 passengers daily.

Surrounding area
ruins of Gakuden Castle

See also
 List of Railway Stations in Japan

References

External links

 Official web page 

Railway stations in Japan opened in 1931
Railway stations in Aichi Prefecture
Stations of Nagoya Railroad
Inuyama, Aichi